Kokshetau Lakes is a group of water bodies in the North Kazakhstan and Akmola regions, Kazakhstan. 

The lakes are in a picturesque mountain setting with rocky outcrops and pine forest covered hill slopes. They are one of the main tourist destinations in Kazakhstan, with holiday cottages and resorts near some of them. Burabay spa town is located in the strip of land between lakes Burabay and Ulken Shabakty. The Kokshetau Lakes are part of the Kokshetau National Park and the Burabay National Park protected areas.

Geography
The Kokshetau Lakes lie in the Kokshetau Hills, part of the northeastern sector of the Kazakh Uplands. Most of them are freshwater lakes of tectonic origin located in a rocky zone made of granite. Often the shores are steep and the lakes are comparatively deep. They are fed mainly by snow and don't dry completely, even in periods of drought.

The main ones are Burabay, Shchuchye, Ulken Shabakty, Kishi Shabakty and Zhukey located in the Kokshetau Massif in the north. Zerendi and Aydabul lie in the central part a little further west. Lake Kopa lies next to Kokshetau city, and lakes Shalkar, Arykbalyk and Imantau are located in the western area. Other lakes are Zholdybay and Ulkensor, as well as Balpashsor, located a little to the north. The latter has foraminiferous mud reputed for its medicinal properties. and  Ulken Shabakty and Zerendi are the largest of the group and also are having the greatest depths.

See also
List of lakes of Kazakhstan

References

External links

Озёра Акмолинской области

Lake groups of Kazakhstan
Kazakh Uplands
ru:Кокшетауские озёра